Eobania is a genus of large, air-breathing, land snails, terrestrial pulmonate gastropod mollusks in the family Helicidae, the true snails or typical snails.

Species
The genus Eobania includes the following species:
 Eobania vermiculata Müller, 1774 - type species

Anatomy
These snails create and use love darts as part of their mating behavior.

Distribution
This genus of snail occurs in the Mediterranean area.

References

Helicidae
Gastropod genera